Garry Alton Hill (November 3, 1946 – September 20, 2017) was a Major League Baseball pitcher. He attended Garinger High School in Charlotte, North Carolina and played college baseball for the 
University of North Carolina at Chapel Hill. After his sophomore year he was drafted in the first round (18th overall) of the 1967 Major League Baseball June secondary draft by the Atlanta Braves. He was starting pitcher for one home game with the Atlanta Braves on June 12, 1969 at Atlanta Stadium against pitcher Dick Selma, striking out two, and one walk. He also gave up four earned runs on six hits, one was a home run to Al Spangler in the 2nd inning. He pitched two and one-thirds innings pitched and had a 15.43 earned run average

He died September 20, 2017 in Charlotte, North Carolina.

References

External links

1946 births
2017 deaths
Arkansas Travelers players
Atlanta Braves players
Austin Braves players
Baseball players from North Carolina
Greenwood Braves players
Major League Baseball pitchers
Richmond Braves players
Savannah Indians players
People from Rutherfordton, North Carolina